Carter J. Eckert is an American academic and author and the Professor of Korean History at Harvard University.

Early life and education
Eckert was born in Chicago, Illinois. He attended Lawrence University, where he studied Western ancient and medieval history. Eckert then undertook graduate studies, earning a Master of Arts in 1968.

After graduating from Harvard, Eckert worked as a Peace Corps Volunteer in Korea. He later returned to the United States to undertake doctoral study in Korean and Japanese history at the University of Washington.

Career
Eckert joined Harvard University in 1985.

In 2004, Eckert was named the first SBS Yoon Se Young Professor. The Yoon Se Young Professorship was established in honor of Yoon Se Young, the chairman of the Seoul Broadcasting System.

Eckert has consulted for the U.S. Department of State on North Korean matters.

Selected works
In a statistical overview derived from writings by and about Carter Eckert, OCLC/WorldCat encompasses roughly 8 works in 10+ publications in 5 languages and 1,000+ library holdings.

 Korea, old and new: a history (1990)
 Offspring of Empire: The Koch'ang Kims and the Colonial Origins of Korean Capitalism, 1876-1945 (1991);   (2004). Winner John K. Fairbank Prize
 Hanʼguk kŭndaehwa, kijŏk ŭi kwajŏng (한국근대화)  Modernization of the Republic of Korea: a Miraculous Achievement (2005)
 Park Chung Hee and Modern Korea: The Roots of Militarism, 1866–1945 (2016)

Honors
 American Historical Association, John K. Fairbank Prize
 Association for Asian Studies, John Whitney Hall Book Prize, 1994
 Fellow, Woodrow Wilson Center for International Scholars, 1996–1997

Notes

External links
Korean Institute Profile: Carter J. Eckert — Harvard University
Department of East Asian Languages and Civilizations Profile: Carter J. Eckert — Harvard University

Harvard University alumni
Harvard University faculty
Historians of Korea
Koreanists
Lawrence University alumni
Living people
University of Washington alumni
Year of birth missing (living people)